Cerithium is a genus of small to medium-sized sea snails, marine gastropod molluscs in the family Cerithiidae, the ceriths.

Species 
Species within this genus include:

Cerithium abditum  Houbrick, 1992
 Cerithium adustum Kiener, 1841
Cerithium africanum  Houbrick, 1992
Cerithium albolineatum  Bozzetti, 2008
Cerithium alucastrum  (Brocchi, 1814)
 Cerithium alutaceum (Gould, 1861)
Cerithium atratum  (Born, 1778) 
Cerithium atromarginatum  Dautzenberg & Bouge, 1933
Cerithium balletoni  Cecalupo, 2009
Cerithium balteatum  Philippi, 1848
Cerithium bayeri  (Petuch, 2001) 
Cerithium boeticum  Pease, 1860
 Cerithium browni (Bartsch, 1928)
Cerithium buzzurroi  Cecalupo, 2005
Cerithium caeruleum  Sowerby, 1855
 † Cerithium calculosum Basterot, 1825 
Cerithium cecalupoi  Cossignani, 2004
Cerithium citrinum  Sowerby, 1855
Cerithium claviforme  Schepman, 1907
Cerithium columna  Sowerby, 1834
Cerithium coralium  Kiener, 1841
Cerithium crassilabrum  Krauss, 1848
Cerithium dialeucum  Philippi, 1849
Cerithium eburneum  Bruguière, 1792 
Cerithium echinatum  Lamarck, 1842
Cerithium egenum  Gould, 1849
 † Cerithium excavatum Brongniart in Cuvier & Brongniart, 1822 
Cerithium flemischi  Martin, 1933
 Cerithium gallapaginis G.B. Sowerby, 1855
 Cerithium gemmatum Hinds, 1844
Cerithium georgianum  Pfeffer, 1886
Cerithium gloriosum  Houbrick, 1992
 Cerithium gracilis Philippi, 1836
Cerithium guinaicum  Philippi, 1849 
Cerithium heteroclites  Lamarck, 1822
Cerithium ianthinum  Gould, 1849
Cerithium interstriatum  Sowerby, 1855
Cerithium ivani  Cecalupo, 2008
Cerithium janthinum  (Gould, 1849 in 1846-50) : synonym of Cerithium zebrum Kiener, 1841
Cerithium kobelti  Dunker, 1877 : synonym of Cerithium dialeucum Philippi, 1849
 Cerithium kreukelorum van Gemert, 2012
Cerithium leptocharactum  Rehder, 1980
Cerithium lifuense  Melvill & Standen, 1895
Cerithium lindae  Petuch, 1987 
Cerithium lissum  Watson, 1880
Cerithium litteratum  (Born, 1778) 
Cerithium lividulum  Risso, 1826
 Cerithium lorenzi Bozzetti, 2020
Cerithium lutosum  Menke, 1828 
 Cerithium maculosum Kiener, 1841
 † Cerithium madreporicola Jousseaume, 1931 
Cerithium madreporicola  Jousseaume, 1930
 Cerithium mangrovum Q.-M. Sun & S.-P. Zhang, 2014
Cerithium matukense  Watson, 1886
 Cerithium mediolaeve Carpenter, 1857
 Cerithium menkei Carpenter, 1857
 † Cerithium miocanariensis Martín-González & Vera-Peláez, 2018 
Cerithium moniliferum Kiener, 1842 : synonym of Clypeomorus batillariaeformis Habe & Kosuge, 1966
Cerithium munitum  Sowerby, 1855
Cerithium muscarum  Say, 1832
Cerithium nesioticum  Pilsbry & Vanatta, 1906
 Cerithium nicaraguense Pilsbry & Lowe, 1932
Cerithium nodulosum  Bruguière, 1792
Cerithium novaehollandiae  Adams in Sowerby, 1855
Cerithium ophioderma  (Habe, 1968)
Cerithium pacificum  Houbrick, 1992
Cerithium phoxum  Watson, 1880
Cerithium placidum  Gould, 1861
Cerithium protractum  Bivona Ant. in Bivona And., 1838
Cerithium punctatum  Bruguière, 1792
Cerithium rehderi  Houbrick, 1992
Cerithium renovatum  Monterosato, 1884
Cerithium rostratum  Sowerby, 1855
Cerithium rubus  Deshayes, 1843: synonym of Cerithium echinatum Lamarck, 1822
 Cerithium rueppelli  Philippi, 1848
 † Cerithium rufonodulosum E. A. Smith, 1901 
Cerithium salebrosum  Sowerby, 1855
Cerithium scabridum  Philippi, 1848
Cerithium scobiniforme  Houbrick, 1992
 Cerithium spinosum Philippi, 1836
 Cerithium stercumuscarum Valenciennes, 1833
 Cerithium subscalatum Pilsbry, 1904
 † Cerithium taeniagranulosum Lozouet, 1999 †
Cerithium tenellum  Sowerby, 1855
Cerithium torresi  Smith, 1884
Cerithium torulosum  (Linnaeus, 1767)
Cerithium traillii  Sowerby, 1855
 † Cerithium trochleare Lamarck, 1804 
Cerithium tuberculatum  (Linnaeus, 1767)
 Cerithium uncinatum (Gmelin, 1791)
Cerithium virgatum  Montfort, 1810 (nomen dubium)
Cerithium vulgatum  Bruguière, 1792
Cerithium zebrum  (Kiener, 1841)
Cerithium zonatum  (Wood, 1828)

Fossil records 

The genus is known from the Triassic to the Recent periods (age range: from 221.5 to 0.0 million years ago). Fossils shells have been found all over the world. There are about 100 extinct species including:
 Cerithium crenatum from the Pliocene of Italy
 Cerithium elegans Deshayes, 1824

Gallery

See also 
 Bittium

References 

OBIS Indo-Pacific Molluscan Database
A Database of Western Atlantic Marine Mollusca
 Vaught, K.C. (1989). A classification of the living Mollusca. American Malacologists: Melbourne, FL (USA). . XII, 195 pp
  Houbrick R.S. (1992). Monograph of the genus Cerithium Bruguière in the Indo-Pacific (Cerithiidae: Prosobranchia). Smithsonian contributions to Zoology 510: 1-211
 Petuch E. 2001. New Gastropods named for Frederick M. Bayer, in Recognition of his Contributions to Tropical Western Atlantic Malacology. Bulletin of the Biological Society of Washington 10 : 334-343
 Gofas, S.; Le Renard, J.; Bouchet, P. (2001). Mollusca, in: Costello, M.J. et al. (Ed.) (2001). European register of marine species: a check-list of the marine species in Europe and a bibliography of guides to their identification. Collection Patrimoines Naturels, 50: pp. 180–213

External links 

Cerithiidae
Gastropod genera
Articles containing video clips
Extant Triassic first appearances